National Day is a public holiday in Myanmar, marking the anniversary of the first university student strike at Rangoon University in 1920. The date is based on the traditional Burmese calendar, occurring on the 10th day following the full moon of Tazaungmon. In Myanmar, National Day is distinct from Independence Day, which is marked on 4 January.

See also 
University of Yangon
British rule in Burma

References 

Burmese culture
Lists of events in Myanmar
Public holidays in Myanmar
Observances set by the Burmese calendar